Daishi Hokuetsu Bank is a Niigata-based bank created by the 2021 merger of The Daishi Bank and Hokuetsu Bank.

History 
The Daishi Bank was the oldest Japanese bank, founded in 1873. The bank founder Shibusawa Eiichi was an important Japanese industrialist and for a certain period the bank served as a national bank.

In October 2008, The Daishi Bank, jointly with Chiba Bank and Hokkoku Bank, hired IBM to build a Call Center System common for the three banks.

References 
Article contains translated text from 第四銀行 on the Japanese Wikipedia retrieved on 10 March 2017.

External links 

 Official website

Banks of Japan
Companies based in Niigata Prefecture
Banks established in 1873
Japanese companies established in 1873